Agriphila cyrenaicellus is a species of moth in the family Crambidae. It is found in southern Europe; in the Middle East; in northern Africa; and in Central Asia. 

The wingspan is about 22 mm.

Notes

References

Moths described in 1887
Crambini
Moths of Europe
Moths of Africa
Moths of Asia